The two species in the genus Phascolosorex, also known as marsupial shrews, are members of the order Dasyuromorphia.

The two species of these dasyurids are:
 Red-bellied marsupial shrew, Phascolosorex doriae (Indonesia)
 Narrow-striped marsupial shrew, Phascolosorex dorsalis (Indonesia and Papua New Guinea)

References

Dasyuromorphs